Saint-Maurice-sur-Vingeanne (literally Saint-Maurice on Vingeanne) is a commune in the Côte-d'Or department in eastern France.

The river Vingeanne runs through the commune.

Population

See also
Communes of the Côte-d'Or department

References

Communes of Côte-d'Or